Alesha may refer to:

 "Alesha" (Law & Order: UK), an episode of the British television show Law & Order: UK
 Alesha-class minelayer, ships used by the Soviet Navy in the 1960s
 Alesha Dixon (born 1978), English singer, dancer, actress, and author
 Alesha Oreskovich (born 1972), American model
 Alesha Zappitella (born 1995), American mixed martial artist

See also
 
 Aleesha, a female given name
 Alisha and Alysha, female given names
 Alyosha (disambiguation)